Drainland is the debut solo studio album by American musician Michael Gira. It was released on June 9, 1995 through Alternative Tentacles record label. Using spare arrangements recorded in August 1994 at musician Bill Rieflin's Seattle home, the album features contributions from Rieflin and Gira's Swans bandmate Jarboe.

Jarboe released her 1995 solo studio album Sacrificial Cake as an accompaniment to Drainland. In April 2017, the record was remastered and re-released together with The Great Annihilator by Swans, which has since been described as an accompanying record to Drainland.

Music and lyrics
The album's sound is characterized by its "hypnotically strummed guitars, chiming bells and eerie swirls of synthesizer and sound effects." The tracks "Where Does Your Body Begin?", "Unreal" and "Your Naked Body"  are primarily acoustic-based and feature various extra instrumental touches, including keyboards and samples. Lyrically, the album explores Gira's "self-delusion of alcoholic detachment," as well as humorous interpretations of "rock star culture and expectations" on tracks such as "Fan Letter." The track "Blind" is originally a Swans song and was taken from the recording sessions for the White Light from the Mouth of Infinity (1991) sessions, and would appear on the 2015 reissue of the album.

Critical reception

Allmusic critic Ned Raggett compared Drainland to accompanying Jarboe piece Sacrificial Cake, describing the album as "a less of a mixed bag than Jarboe's own musically varied solo efforts, yet it has distinct strengths." Raggett further wrote: "Gira brings his expected bleak, alienated but still heartfelt lyrical visions to the fore, steering away from the full, epic grind of Swans and towards a variety of more restrained musical visions." SF Weekly wrote: "Whether they're strumming sweet melodies on acoustic guitars or banging large metallic objects together, Gira and dulcet-toned partner Jarboe turn sunshine into something sinister." Philip Sherburne of Wondering Sound described the record as a "bitter and at times bilious album, an unsparing self-portrait of the artist as an ugly man."

Track listing

Personnel
 Michael Gira – vocals, electric and acoustic guitar, samples, production, engineering, design, arrangement
 Bill Rieflin – keyboards, electric bass guitar, samples, programming, production, arrangement, engineering
 Jarboe – backing vocals, sounds, keyboards, samples, production, arrangement
 John Yates – layout
 Wim Van De Hulst – photography
Additional Personnel on "Blind"
Kristof Hahn - guitars
 Clinton Steele - guitars
 Jenny Wade - bass guitar
 Anton Fier- Drums

References

External links
 

1995 debut albums
Michael Gira albums
Alternative Tentacles albums
Albums produced by Michael Gira
Albums produced by Jarboe
Sub Rosa Records albums